Honeyri or Haneyri may refer to:
 Honeyri 1
 Honeyri 2
 Honeyri 3